Mare Marginis is a lunar mare that lies on the very edge of the lunar nearside. The selenographic coordinates of this feature are 13.3° N, 86.1° E, and the diameter is 358 km. The name is Latin for "Sea of the Edge".

This mare differs from most of the nearside maria; it has an irregular outline and it appears to be fairly thin. It has small circular and elongated features in the mare plains that 
probably mark impact craters buried by less than 1000 to 1700 feet (300 to 500 m) of lava. Further, Mare Marginis is not centered on any clear, large impact basin. Thus, Mare Marginis seems to mark a low-lying region of the highlands where mare lavas were just able to reach the surface. Several large mare-floored craters also occur nearby. In these craters, the crater floors lie below the surrounding highland surface. Thus, they mark sites around Mare Marginis where lavas were close to the lunar surface. The major crater to the north of Marginis is Al-Biruni, with Ibn Yunus to the southeast and Goddard to the northwest.

The surface of this mare displays some lunar swirls; higher albedo deposits that are similar to the Reiner Gamma feature on the Oceanus Procellarum. This feature is associated with a relatively strong magnetic field. It is also located at the antipode of the Mare Orientale impact basin, and may be associated with the formation of that feature. Other possible explanations for the formation include a cometary impact, venting of volcanic gases, or just normal surface markings that are shielded from space weathering due to the magnetic field. But the exact cause of albedo features such as this are not completely understood.

Views

See also
Volcanism on the Moon

References

 Paul D. Spudis, The Once and Future Moon, Smithsonian Institution Press, 1996, .

Marginis